The Marconi Trail is a scenic roadway in the Canadian province of Nova Scotia.

Located in eastern Cape Breton Island, the route is entirely within the Cape Breton Regional Municipality and runs from Louisbourg to Glace Bay along the island's eastern coast.

The Glace Bay terminus is at the Marconi National Historic Site, which marks the location of the first radio transmission from North America to Europe, made by Guglielmo Marconi in 1902.

Mira Gut Bridge
Macroni Trail crossed the Mira River along Mira Bay Drive at the community of Mira Gut along the 140-year-old Mira Gut Bridge. In 2017, the structure was demolished after it was deemed unsafe. A replacement bridge is slated to be open in 2022, but in the meantime travelers must take a  detour along Brickyard Road and Hornes Road (Route 255), crossing the Mira River along Trunk 22 at Albert Bridge.

Highways

Numbered 
 Route 255

Named Roads 
 Louisbourg Main-à-Dieu Road
 Main-à-Dieu Road
 Mira Bay Drive
 Long Beach Road
 Donkin Highway

Communities
Louisbourg
Little Lorraine
Main-à-Dieu
Bateston
Catalone Gut
Mira Gut
Round Island
Homeville
Black Brook
Port Morien
Donkin
Port Caledonia
Glace Bay

References

Guglielmo Marconi
Scenic travelways in Nova Scotia
Roads in the Cape Breton Regional Municipality